Horeb  may refer to:
Mount Horeb, possibly another name for the Biblical Mount Sinai
Mount Horeb, Wisconsin, in Dane County, Wisconsin
Mount Horeb Sasthamcotta, ashram in Kerala, India
Horeb, Carmarthenshire, Wales
Horeb, Ohio, United States
Horeb Chapel, Llwydcoed, Rhondda Cynon Taf, Wales
A work of Jewish philosophy by Rabbi Samson Raphael Hirsch